Henry John Barr (11 January 1880 –  28 July 1909) was an  Australian rules footballer who played with St Kilda in the Victorian Football League (VFL).		

He died in July 1909 when the SS Waratah sank off the South African coast.

References

External links 		
		

1880 births
Australian rules footballers from Victoria (Australia)
St Kilda Football Club players
1909 deaths